Morphosis is the sixth album by Polish death metal band Hate. This album is mostly a death metal release, with some blackened death metal and Industrial influences. The album was mixed by the Wiesławski Bros. in August, 2007 at the Hertz studio in Poland and mastered by Kris Wawrzak and Adam The First Sinner at Efektura Studio in Warsaw, October 2007. The album was originally released under Listenable Records, but was released in Brazil under by Paranoid Records in June, 2008. The recording took place in two studios in Poland; mainly at Hertz Studio, but also at Efectura Studio. All songs were written and arranged by Adam The First Sinner with assistance of Hexen, except the song Immum Coeli (Everlasting World) which was written by the assistance of both Hexen and Destroyer.

Track listing

Personnel

Hate
 Adam "ATF Sinner" Buszko – vocals, guitars, bass, synthesizers, producer, mastering
 Konrad "Destroyer" Ramotowski – guitars
 Stanislaw "Hexen" Malanowicz – drums

Production
 Wojciech & Sławomir Wiesłąscy – mixing, sound engineering
 Artur Sochan – photography
 Krzysztof "Kris" Wawrzak – co-producer, mastering
 Sven – layout, graphic designs

Recording
 Recorded at Hertz Studio, Bialystok, August 2007. 
 Mastered at Efektura Studio, Warsaw, October 2007.

References

2008 albums
Listenable Records albums